Xinghai may refer to:

 The semilegendary "Sea of Stars" traditionally considered the source of China's Yellow River
Xinghai County, in Hainan Tibetan Autonomous Prefecture, Qinghai, China
Xinghai Conservatory of Music, in Guangzhou, Guangdong, China
Xinghai Square, in Dalian, Liaoning, China
Beijing Xinghai Piano Group Limited, musical instrument manufacturers in China